José Carlos Ary dos Santos, GCIH or just Ary dos Santos (Lisboa, December 7, 1936 – Lisboa, January 18, 1984) was one of the most relevant names of the Portuguese popular poetry of the 20th century.

Born of a bourgeois family, Ary dos Santos soon developed several skills for poetry. At only 14, the family published some poems, against his will - (he thought the poems were not good enough). In 1954, at the age of 16, Ary saw some of his poems being selected for the Anthology of the Almeida Garrett prize. After that, Ary fell out with his father and left his family home, working on several jobs, like errand boy, bubblegum and machines seller, tutor, docker, clerk and finally publicist. His poetic work continued to develop and in 1963 he published his first book, A Liturgia do Sangue [Liturgy of Blood].

1969 was the year that changed Ary's life, as he liked to say. He became a member of the Portuguese Communist Party and quickly developed his revolutionary vein.

Ary dos Santos established himself as one of the best known poets of his time by virtue of his song-writing. Having a profound impact in late 20th-century Portuguese music, Ary dos Santos authored more than 600 hundred lyrics, voiced by the most respected Portuguese singers such as Amalia Rodrigues, Simone de Oliveira, Carlos do Carmo, Paulo de Carvalho and Fernando Tordo.

Ary participated, under a pseudonym, in the 1969's RTP Song Contest, writing the lyrics of the winning song: A Desfolhada, performed by Simone de Oliveira.

During his career, Ary also wrote several revolutionary poems, for political intervention, about the Estado Novo regime's anti-democratic policies, the need for freedom and celebrating the post-revolutionary conquests, which led him to be called the poet of the revolution.

Ary dos Santos died at age 46 from cirrhosis.

References

External links

1937 births
1984 deaths
People from Lisbon
Portuguese anti-fascists
Portuguese Communist Party politicians
20th-century Portuguese poets
Portuguese male poets
Portuguese male songwriters
Portuguese LGBT poets
Portuguese LGBT songwriters
LGBT history in Portugal
20th-century Portuguese LGBT people
Deaths from cirrhosis